The Orpheum Theatre is a 1364-seat theatre in downtown Phoenix. This venue was originally used for vaudeville acts as part of the nationwide Orpheum Circuit.

History
Construction began in 1927 and was completed in 1929 for a total cost of $750,000. It was designed by architects Lescher & Mahoney, with Hugh Gilbert associated. It was built for owner-operators J.E. Rickards and Harry Nace by the McGinty Construction Company. Built in a Spanish Revival style of Spanish Baroque architecture style, intricate murals and moldings were an integral part of the design, all meant to give patrons the impression that they were enjoying the shows "al fresco."

In the 1940s the Orpheum was purchased by the Paramount Pictures chain, and renamed, "The Paramount."  In the 1960s Nederlander purchased it to add it as a stop on the Broadway circuit.  Throughout the 1960s until its restoration, it was renamed, "Palace West."

Throughout the mid 1970s and early 1980s, the Theatre was leased to the local Mexican enterprising Corona family, who presented a wide variety of Hispanic events and movies.  At one point all the murals and moldings were painted black when the Orpheum was used to show Spanish films. In addition to wanting to hide the areas that were already in poor condition, it was thought that such decorations would detract from the films.

Restoration
After falling into disrepair for some years, the city of Phoenix purchased the Orpheum Theatre in 1984 and began a 12-year, $14 million restoration. The Conrad Schmitt Studios created the transformation and the Orpheum reopened on January 28, 1997, with a performance of Hello, Dolly! starring Carol Channing.  After the performance, Ms. Channing, still in costume but out of character, thanked the audience for "not turning this beautiful theatre into a parking lot!"

Present day
The Orpheum Theatre of Phoenix was placed on the National Register of Historic Places in 1985.

In 1997, the Orpheum became home of the newly-formed Phoenix Opera.

In addition to the Phoenix Opera, the Orpheum presents concerts, Broadway musicals, performances of Ballet Arizona and special events.

See also

 List of historic properties in Phoenix, Arizona

References

External links

 Official website
 Friends of the Orpheum Theatre

Cinemas and movie theaters in Arizona
Music venues in Arizona
Theatres in Arizona
Buildings and structures in Phoenix, Arizona
Culture of Phoenix, Arizona
Phoenix Points of Pride
Theatres completed in 1929
National Register of Historic Places in Phoenix, Arizona
Theatres on the National Register of Historic Places in Arizona
Event venues established in 1929
Tourist attractions in Phoenix, Arizona
Spanish Revival architecture in the United States
1929 establishments in Arizona